Prince Adalberto of Savoy, Duke of Bergamo (19 March 1898 – 15 December 1982), was an Italian prince of the House of Savoy.

Early life 
Born in Turin, Prince Adalberto was the fourth son of Prince Tommaso, Duke of Genoa, and his wife Princess Isabella of Bavaria (1863–1924). On 22 September 1904 he was given the title Duke of Bergamo.

Military career 
Prince Adalberto pursued a career in the Royal Italian Army, achieving the rank of General. He fought in the First World War on the Montello in October 1917, and in Vallagarina in February 1918. In 1936, he commanded the Italian 24 Infantry Division Gran Sasso during the Second Italo-Ethiopian War and later the 58th Infantry Division Legnano.

When Italy joined World War II, he became commander of the Italian 8th Army (1940–1942), and in 1943 of the 7th Army. Benito Mussolini used the Prince's secret homosexuality against him to ensure the loyalty of the Prince as well as other LGBT members of the House of Savoy to the Fascist Party.

Later life 
After the war he lived quietly and mostly anonymously, and settled in a villa on the property of his friend, Gertrud Kiefer von Raffler (the widow of Massimo Olivetti, son of Camillo Olivetti), where he died in 1982.

Ancestry

References 

1898 births
1982 deaths
Burials at the Basilica of Superga
Italian generals
Italian military personnel of World War I
Italian military personnel of World War II
Italian princes
Military personnel from Turin
Nobility from Turin
Non-inheriting heirs presumptive